M.A. Pathan was the chairman of the Indian Oil Corporation Ltd. from February 1997 to March 2002.  Pathan has a daughter named Malhar, and a son named Mohit. He had been on the Indian Oil Board since 1994 as the director-in-charge of marketing. He was also the chairman of the Petroleum Federation of India (PetroFed) from 1 April 2002 to 3 August 2003.

Early life and education 
M.A. Pathan was born on 9 March 1942. He has a B.A. (Hons.) degree in economics and diploma in petroleum management from Cambridge, Massachusetts, US. He has nearly five decades of experience in the oil industry.

Career 
He joined Indian Oil in 1962 and served various leadership roles including as chairman, Indian Oil Corporation Ltd. from February 1997 to March 2002. Some of the positions he held during his career include;
 Group Resident Director, Delhi with TATAs, from 1 November 2002 till 30 September 2007.
 Member of the Society "National Centre for Gender Training, Planning & Research" of LBSNAA, Government of India, Mussoorie (April 2005).
 President of Society for Preservation of Healthy Environment and Ecology and the Heritage of Agra (since July 1, 2006).
 Regional Director for South and South-East Asia, Global Union Ventures Ltd. (1 December 2007 till 30 November 2009).
 Director on the Board of Tata McGraw Hill Education Pvt. Ltd., Noida, U.P. (7 August 2007 till 10 June 2010).
 Appointed Chairman of Tata Petrodyne Ltd., Mumbai (June 2007 till March 2012).
 Director on the Board of Delhi District & Cricket Association until April 2008.
 Member, Governing Council of the Lal Bahadur Shastri Institute of Management & Technology, Bareilly (UP) w.e.f. 3 November 2008.
 Appointed Member, International Advisory Board, Kuwait Petroleum Corporation (1 January 2008 till 31 December 2009).
 Appointed as Member of International Advisory Board, ic2 Capital LLP., London (July 2008 till 30 June 2009.
 Member, National Committee on Hydrocarbons, Confederation of Indian Industry w.e.f. 22 June 2010.
 Part-time non-executive Director on the Board of Cochin Shipyard Limited (Ministry of Shipping, Road transport & Highways, Govt. of India) from 25 July 2008 till 14 July 2011.
 Member in Pipeline Advisory Committee of Petroleum and Natural Gas Regulatory Board from 20 May 2009 till its dissolution in 2011.
 Chairman of the Apex Group for guiding & monitoring of R&D activities of Indian Oil Corporation Limited, Faridabad w.e.f. 13 May 2011.
 Appointed Chief Mentor (Enterprise Business) in Tata Teleservices Ltd. (January 2008 till 30 June 2012).
 Non-executive part-time Director on the Board of Bharat Heavy Electricals Limited from 11 June 2009 till 21 June 2012.
 Chairman on the Board of Jabal EILIOT Company Ltd (A Joint Venture between Engineers India Ltd, Jabal Dhahran Company Ltd & IOT Infrastructure & Energy Services Ltd at Saudi Arabia) from 8 September 2011 till 31 October 2013.
 Independent Director on the Board of Subros Ltd., w.e.f. 8 November 2013.
 External Eminent Mentor of the Committee of Planning & Monitoring Board of Dayalbagh Educational Institute of Agra w.e.f. February 2014.
 Member on the Board of Governors of the University of Petroleum and Energy Studies, Dehradun w.e.f. 28 March 2014.
 Strategic Advisor in IOT Infrastructure & Energy Services Ltd. from September 2002 till 31 March 2015.
In addition to above roles, Pathan also held large assignments as co-chairman emeritus, International Energy Advisory Council (IEAC), U.S., advisor emeritus for Global Union Energy Ventures. and vice-president on the board for three years and thereafter served as the vice-chairman of the advisory council of World LP Gas Association, Paris.

Pathan has contributed various technical and management papers at several national and international fora. For the past several years, he is involved in the formulation of petroleum policies in India.

Awards 
SCOPE Award for Excellence and Immense Contribution to Public Sector Management – Individual Category
New Millennium  Top CEO Award for Excellence
Dadabhai Naoroji New Millennium Award
National Citizen's Award 2001
Best Industrial Manager Award 2000–2001
Mother Teresa Award – For Corporation Citizen 2001
CEPM – PMA Honorary Fellowship for 2002
Petrotech Lifetime Achievement Award - 2012 in Oil & Gas Sector
Hall of Fame, Leadership & Excellence Award -2014 in Oil & Gas
Global Excellence Award – 2015  in Petroleum Sector
Life Time Achievement Award – 2015 in Oil & Gas (Urja Sangam 2015)
Meritorious Energy Service Award 2017 in his exemplary services to Indian Energy Sector by India Energy Forum
IDEC (India Drilling & Exploration Conference) Award in recognition of his outstanding contribution & personal dedication to the growth of Oil & gas industry in June 2018 at Mumbai  
He has also Awarded by Umeed Foundation presents 'Milli Star Award' for his remarkable services towards betterment of the community in 2021

References

1942 births
Living people
Indian chief executives